Horace Milton Jose (30 March 1893 – 19 May 1966) was an Australian rules footballer who played with Collingwood in the Victorian Football League (VFL).

Notes

External links 

		
Horrie Jose's profile at Collingwood Forever

1893 births
1966 deaths
Australian rules footballers from Melbourne
Collingwood Football Club players
People from North Melbourne